Anne-Louis Girodet de Roussy-Trioson (or de Roucy), also known as Anne-Louis Girodet-Trioson or simply Girodet (29 January 17679 December 1824), was a French painter and pupil of Jacques-Louis David, who participated in the early Romantic movement by including elements of eroticism in his paintings. Girodet is remembered for his precise and clear style and for his paintings of members of the Napoleonic family.

Early career
Girodet was born at Montargis. Both of his parents died when he was a young adult. The care of his inheritance and education fell to his guardian, a prominent physician named Benoît-François Trioson, "médecin-de-mesdames", who later adopted him. The two men remained close throughout their lives and Girodet took the surname Trioson in 1812. In school he first studied architecture and pursued a military career. He changed to the study of painting under a teacher named Luquin and then entered the school of Jacques-Louis David. At the age of 22 he successfully competed for the Prix de Rome with a painting of the Story of Joseph and his Brethren. From 1789 to 1793 he lived in Italy and while in Rome he painted his Hippocrate refusant les presents d'Artaxerxes and Endymion-dormant (now in the Louvre), a work which gained him great acclaim at the Salon of 1793 and secured his reputation as a leading painter in the French school.

Once he returned to France, Girodet painted many portraits, including some of members of the Bonaparte family. In 1806, in competition with the Sabines of David, he exhibited his Scène de déluge (Louvre), which was awarded the decennial prize. In 1808 he produced the Reddition de Vienne and Atala au tombeau, a work which won immense popularity, by its fortunate choice of subject – François-René de Chateaubriand's novel Atala, first published in 1801 – and its remarkable departure from the theatricality of Girodet's usual manner. He would return to his theatrical style in La Révolte du Caire (1810).

Later life

Girodet was a member of the Academy of Painting and of the Institut de France, a knight of the Order of Saint Michael, and officer of the Legion of Honour. Among his pupils were Hyacinthe Aubry-Lecomte, Augustin Van den Berghe the Younger, François Edouard Bertin, Angélique Bouillet, Alexandre-Marie Colin, Marie Philippe Coupin de la Couperie, Henri Decaisne, Paul-Emile Destouches, Achille Devéria, Eugène Devéria, Savinien Edme Dubourjal, Joseph Ferdinand Lancrenon, Antonin Marie Moine, Jean Jacques François Monanteuil, Henry Bonaventure Monnier, Rosalie Renaudin, Johann Heinrich Richter, François Edme Ricois, Joseph Nicolas Robert-Fleury, and Philippe Jacques Van Brée.

In his forties his powers began to fail, and his habit of working at night and other excesses weakened his constitution. In the Salon of 1812 he exhibited only a Tête de Vierge; in 1819 Pygmalion et Galatée showed a further decline of strength. In 1824, the year in which he produced his portraits of Cathelineau and Bonchamps, Girodet died on December 9 in Paris. At a sale of his effects after his death, some of his drawings realized enormous prices.

Posthumously published work

Girodet produced a vast quantity of illustrations, amongst which may be cited those for the Didot editions of the works of Virgil (1798) and Racine (1801–1805). Fifty-four of his designs for the works of the ancient Greek poet Anacreon were engraved by M.  Châtillon. Girodet used much of his time on literary composition. His poem Le Peintre (rather a string of commonplaces), together with poor imitations of classical poets, and essays on Le Génie and La Grâce, were published posthumously in 1829, with a biographical notice by his friend Coupin de la Couperie. Delecluze, in his Louis David et son temps, has also a brief life of Girodet.

Girodet: Romantic Rebel at the Art Institute of Chicago (2006) was the first retrospective in the United States devoted to the works of Anne-Louis Girodet de Roussy-Trioson. The exhibition assembled more than 100 seminal works (about 60 paintings and 40 drawings) that demonstrated the artist's range as a painter as well as a draftsman.

Analysis of the works
Girodet was trained in the neoclassical style of his teacher, Jacques-Louis David, seen in his treatment of the male nude body and his reference to models from the Renaissance and Classical antiquity. However, he also deviated from this style in several ways. The peculiarities which mark Girodet's position as the herald of the romantic movement are already evident in his Sleep of Endymion (1791, also called Effet de lune or "effect of the Moon"). Although the subject matter and pose are inspired by classical precedents, Girodet's diffuse lighting is more theatrical and atmospheric. The androgynous depiction of the sleeping shepherd Endymion is also noteworthy. These early romantic effects were even more notable in his Ossian, exhibited in 1802. Girodet portrayed recently killed Napoleonic soldiers being welcomed into Valhalla by the fictional bard Ossian. The painting is striking for its inclusion of phosphorescent meteors, vaporous luminosity, and spectral protagonists.

The same coupling of classic and romantic elements marks Girodet's Danae (1799) and his Quatre Saisons, executed for the king of Spain (repeated for Compiègne), and shows itself to a ludicrous extent in his Fingal (Leuchtenberg collection, St. Petersburg), executed for Napoleon in 1802. Girodet can be seen here combining aspects of his classical training and traditional education with new literary trends, popular scientific spectacles, and a consummate interest in the strange and the bizarre. In this way his work announces the rise of a romantic aesthetic which prizes individuality, expression, and imagination over an adherence to classical academic precedents.

Gallery

See also
 List of Orientalist artists

References

Further reading
 (see index)

External links

 Miscellaneous works (Art Renewal Center)
 Three portraits by Girodet (Insecula encyclopedia)
 Works of Girodet at http://www.the-athenaeum.org

1767 births
1824 deaths
People from Montargis
18th-century French painters
19th-century French painters
Burials at Père Lachaise Cemetery
Chevaliers of the Légion d'honneur
French male painters
French romantic painters
Prix de Rome for painting
Pupils of Jacques-Louis David
Orientalist painters
19th-century male artists
18th-century French male artists